Makoto Kobayashi may refer to:

, Japanese manga artist
, Japanese physicist
, President of the Organizing Committee for the 1998 Winter Olympics and Paralympics